Peceli Wawavanua (also spelt Wawavamia) is a Fijian former professional rugby league footballer who represented Fiji in the 2000 World Cup.

Playing career
Wawavanua played for Fiji at the 2000 World Cup, making one appearance from the bench and starting the match against England at hooker.

In 2007 he was part of the "Australian Fijian" squad that won the St Mary's sevens tournament.

References

Living people
Fijian rugby league players
Fiji national rugby league team players
Rugby league hookers
I-Taukei Fijian people
Year of birth missing (living people)